Ewa Brodnicka (born 7 June 1984) is a Polish female professional boxer who held the WBO female junior-lightweight title from 2018 to October 2020. At regional level she held the European female lightweight title from 2015 to 2016. As of November 2019, she is ranked as the world’s fifth best active female junior-lightweight by The Ring and BoxRec.

Professional boxing record

References

External links

Living people
1984 births
Polish women boxers
People from Nowy Dwór Mazowiecki
World Boxing Organization champions
Lightweight boxers